Clovis Morales (born 27 February 1949) is a Honduran long distance runner. He is most known for setting Honduran records in the 3000m, 10000m and the marathon. He competed in the men's 5000 metres at the 1968 Summer Olympics.

See also 
 List of Honduran records in athletics

References

External links

1949 births
Athletes (track and field) at the 1968 Summer Olympics
Honduran male marathon runners
Living people
Olympic athletes of Honduras
Central American Games silver medalists for Honduras
Central American Games medalists in athletics